Nassa may refer to:

 Nassa, Noradrenergic and specific serotonergic antidepressant
 Nassa (gastropod)
 NASSA, Negro American Space Society of Astronauts, a fictitious organization from the mockumentary The Old Negro Space Program